Tony Wakeham is a Canadian politician, who was elected to the Newfoundland and Labrador House of Assembly in the 2019 provincial election. He represents the electoral district of Stephenville-Port au Port as a member of the Newfoundland and Labrador Progressive Conservative Party. He was re-elected in the 2021 provincial election. On January 17, 2023, Wakeham announced he would be a candidate in the 2023 provincial PC leadership election.

In 2018, Wakeham ran for the leadership of the Progressive Conservative Party of Newfoundland and Labrador, but was defeated by St. John's lawyer Ches Crosbie. The final tally was Crosbie with 2,298.92 and Wakeham with 1,701.08 points respectively.

Prior to entering politics, Wakeham was the CEO of Labrador-Grenfell Health Authority, was a franchisee of many KFC restaurants and has served as the President of both the Newfoundland and Labrador Basketball Association and Basketball Canada.

Election results

References

Living people
Progressive Conservative Party of Newfoundland and Labrador MHAs
21st-century Canadian politicians
Year of birth missing (living people)